Nizhnebikkuzino (Tübänge Bikquja) is a rural locality (a village) and the administrative centre of Nizhnebikkuzinsky Selsoviet, Kugarchinsky District, Bashkortostan, Russia. The population was 263 as of 2010. There are 4 streets.

Geography 
Nizhnebikkuzino is located 44 km north of Mrakovo (the district's administrative centre) by road. Pribelsky is the nearest rural locality.

References 

Rural localities in Kugarchinsky District